Kiss My Mouth is a 1993 EP by Magnapop released in Europe by Play It Again Sam Records on Compact Disc (catalogue number 450.0243.22 - BIAS 243 CD) and 12" gramophone record (450.0243.30 - BIAS 243.) Two of these tracks would later be re-recorded for their 1994 studio album Hot Boxing.

Track listing
All songs written by Linda Hopper and Ruthie Morris
"Texas" (Remix) – 4:32
"Lay It Down" – 2:57
"Precious" – 1:48
"Nowhere" – 2:53

Personnel
Magnapop
Linda Hopper – lead vocals
David McNair – drums
Ruthie Morris – guitar, backing vocals
Shannon Mulvaney – bass guitar

Production
Chris Bilheimer – design
Eli Janney – engineering
Ruth Leitman – photography
Ted Niceley – production
Jim Rondinelli – remixing on "Texas"

External links

Kiss My Mouth at Discogs

1993 EPs
Magnapop EPs
PIAS Recordings EPs
Albums produced by Ted Niceley